Sherry Finzer (born August 23, 1963) is an American flutist and composer based in Phoenix, Arizona. A national award-winning musician known for her contributions in the genre of flute and New Age music, Finzer is known predominantly as a soloist, but in recent years has formed the supergroup Trialogue with guitarist Darin Mahoney and percussionist Will Clipman. She performs extensively with local, national and international musicians, encompassing a variety of musical styles, including new-age, Latin, flamenco, classical, pop and jazz. Finzer tours worldwide as a Guo Flute and Pearl Flute Performing Artist, as well as in support of her album releases for the Heart Dance Records label, which she founded in 2006. Heart Dance Records represents 80+ artists in the New Age, Ambient, Acoustic, Electronic and Chill genres, as well as the radio promotions and PR company Higher Level Media.

Early life and education
Finzer was born in Syracuse, New York, on August 23, 1963. When she was 12, her father took a job offer that moved her family to Henrietta, a suburb of Rochester, New York, where she attended Charles H. Roth High School and studied music.

Career
As a classical performer, Finzer was a member of the Brockport Symphony Orchestra  from 1986 to 1988, and of the Greece Symphony Orchestra from 2003 to 2004. Between 2000 and 2005, she provided musical accompaniment in a number of choirs, orchestras and ensembles, including the Silver Tones Flute Choir, NRG! Flute Duo, the Caprice flute trio, the Trillium Ensemble, Canatabile Flute Quartet, CAFE, the Arizona Flute Society Alle Breve choir, Desert Echoes Flute Project  and is a performing member of the World Flute Society, Mindful Music Association and National Flute Association.

Finzer has released several solo albums, collaborations, and multiple collections in supergroups. In 2006 she teamed up with acoustic and electric guitarist Ric Flauding to release her debut album Desert Journey, a collection of new age and world music instrumentals arranged for flute and guitar. The first of Finzer's Sanctuary albums followed in 2009, and in the same year she and harpist VeeRonna Ragone formed Dulce VAS, releasing a jazz fusion, Latin flair Christmas album of traditional holiday songs performed as mambos, sambas and rhumbas entitled Christmas Picante. In 2010, she released Masquerade and Radiant Sky, the latter being a second album with Flauding and a host of other musicians, including fellow flutist Tina Beaton, percussionist Freddie Colon, and guitarists Will Chapin, Pedro Perez and Evan Drummond.

In 2011, Finzer has released several solo albums, including her Sanctuary trilogy, Acceptance, and her "naked flute" series recorded in an empty water silo at The Tank in Rangely, CO. The first in this series, inspired by the solo recordings of Paul Horn, Transcendence, was released in 2019, later Renewal (2020), Connections (2022), and recently Synesthesia in 2022.

Having found a unique voice and interest in the subgenre of "healing music", she collaborated with guitarist Darin Mahoney in 2013 for the release of Transformation an album the two artists composed to foster an emotional experience for those faced with life-threatening illnesses - most specifically cancer, of which Mahoney is a survivor. The album was engineered by John Herrera at Clamsville Studios and won One World Music UK's Album of the Year award in 2013. Finzer's 2014 release of Sanctuary III: Beyond the Dream, received widespread acclaim and award nominations, most notably on the long running NPR show Echoes. The album's closing track "Song For Rex" garnered considerable attention as a piece composed for her grandson with Down Syndrome. Hundreds of children with DS submitted their photos for use in the song's video.

Finzer has also collaborated with Native American Flutist Mark Holland on Flute Flight. and Somewhere New - albums of ambient and atmospheric music performed on concert flutes (c flute, alto flute, bass and contrabass flute), Native American Flutes and the addition of synths, piano and percussion. 2016 brought three new collaborative albums from Finzer into the Heart Dance Records catalog - 'Trialogue' a world/americana style album with guitarist Darin Mahoney  and seven-time GRAMMY Nominee and pan-global percussionist Will Clipman, Majestica - 'In the Midst of Stars' with Cass Anawaty, and a meditational album with Tom Moore titled Whispers from Silence. Sherry has continued with several additional award-winning releases with Tom Moore including Let There Be Light( 2017), Sound Currents (2019) and A Journey for Mankind (2019). Other notable collaborations are Remembrances (2018) and Strength & Serenity (2020) with pianist Greg Maroney, Soul Espanol (2020) with flamenco guitarist Chris B. Jacome, ambient collaborations with City of Dawn, and singles with pianists Joseph Akins and Lynn Tredeau.

In addition to her prolific recording and performance schedule, having grown to over 80+ new age, acoustic, neoclassical, contemporary instrumental, and meditative music performers, including Eddy Ruyter (of Shawn Mendes, Ed Sheeran and more), former Windham Hill artist Scott Cossu, Cass Anawaty, and Tom Moore guitarists Darin Mahoney, Ken Verheecke Chris B. Jácome Michael Kent Smith and Don Latarski percussionists Will Clipman. & Byron Metcalf. pianists Lisa Swerdlow. Lynn Yew Evers. Philip Shpartov. Lynn Tredeau. and Greg Maroney. flutists Peter Sheridan. and Monica Williams., and ambient artists City of Dawn, Italian-based Andrea Bacci, Norway-based Frolin, and Dream Cycle.

Artistry
Finzer's sound is influenced by the artists she collaborates with, and by the instruments she uses. She incorporates a variety of flutes in her compositions, where wind instruments are mixed with ambient soundscapes, ethereal sounds, natural and other ethnic arrangements to create her soundscapes. She mixes modern electronic modes and Eastern scales and melodies that evoke an air of mystery and intrigue. Critic RJ Lannan, of Zone Music Reporter, describes her compositions as “deeply haunting…calms and yet piques the senses," and compared some of her more thematic works to “a rush of water in a desert gorge." Lannan goes on to liken the often empyrean suggestions in her work as "comets and asteroids zooming through space...with the music becoming a springboard for...playful fantasies." Echoes Radio show host, John Diliberto, intimates that her sound "explor[es] a deeper modality hovering between new age meditations and ambient chamber music."

Personal life 
After marrying in 1983 at the age of 20, Finzer and her husband moved north to the border town of Greece. They have two children, one of which is jazz musician Nick Finzer. In 2005 the family moved west, residing in Anthem, Arizona.

Discography
       Desert Journey (2006)
       Sanctuary (2009)
       Christmas Picante [with Dulce VAS] (2009)
 	Masquerade (2010)
 	Radiant Sky (2010)
 	Sanctuary II: Earth (2011)
 	Someone Like Me (2012)
 	Transformation (2013) w/ Darin Mahoney
 	Sanctuary III: Beyond The Dream (2014)
       Flute Flight (2015) w/ Mark Holland
       In The Midst of Stars [with Majestica] (2016) 
       Trialogue (2016) w/ Darin Mahoney & Will Clipman 
       Whispers from Silence (2016) w/Tom Moore
       Traveler (2017) w/Peter Sheridan       Let There Be Light (2017) w/ Tom Moore       Auriga to Orion - Majestica (2018)       Somewhere New w/Mark Holland (2018)       Let There Be Light Deluxe Version w/Tom Moore (2018)       Acceptance (2018)        Sound Currents w/ Tom Moore (2019)        A Journey for Mankind w/Tom Moore (2019)        The Space Between Breaths w/Will Clipman (2019)        Christmas Picante w/VeeRonna Ragone (remastered) (2019)        Transcendence (2020)        Strength & Serenity - Flute & Piano w/Greg Maroney (2020)        Soul Espanol w/Chris B. Jacome (2020)        Desert Suite w/Greg Maroney (2021)
Solace w/City Of Dawn (2021)
Connections (2022)
Moonwheel w/City of Dawn (2022)
Centered w/Karasvana (2022)
Synesthesia (2022)

Performances and appearances
 Echoes Radio Living Room Concert with Majestica - Chester, PA
       World Flute Society Convention - Eau Claire, WI
       The Musical Instrument Museum - Phoenix, AZ
       National Flute Association Conventions in Albuquerque, NM, Pittsburgh, PA, San Diego, CA, Anaheim, CA
       Green Valley Performing Arts Center - Green Valley, AZ
       Loyola University - Roussell Hall - New Orleans, LA
       Moss Performing Arts Center Recital Hall - Grand Junction, CO
 	University of Alaska – Fairbanks, AK
 	The Joy Theater – New Orleans, LA
 	Brisbane Jazz Club – Brisbane, Australia
 	Crossings Theatre – Narrabri, NSW Australia
 	Foundry616 – Sydney, NSW Australia
       Buena Vista Social Club – Melbourne, South Australia
	Mesa Arts Center – Mesa, AZ
       Tempe Center for the Arts – Tempe, AZ 
       Old Town Center for the Arts – Cottonwood, AZ
       Arcosanti – Mayer, AZ
 	Desert Botanical Garden – Phoenix, AZ
 	Unity Church of Albuquerque – Albuquerque, NM
 	Sedona Creative Life Center – Sedona, AZ
 	King of Glory Church Concert Series – Tempe, AZ
 	Mountain View Lutheran Church – Phoenix, AZ
 	Tlaquepaque – Sedona, AZ
       Phoenix Art Museum – Phoenix, AZ
       Sea of Glass – Tucson, AZ

 Radio interviews 
       Echoes Radio – NPR
       RAF/STL The Sound of Art with Jim Doyle
       St. Louis Public Radio with Steve Potter
       Harborough FM with Terry Hawke
       KAFM Radio - Grand Junction, CO
       WMSE - Instrumental Saturdays with Mary Bartlein - Milwaukee, Wi

Awards and nominations
Flute competitions: 1st Place 	 Rochester Flute Association 2002
        Rochester Flute Association 2004
 	 National Flute Association – Newly Published Music – 2006 Pittsburgh
 	 National Flute Association – Professional Flute Choir – 2006 Pittsburgh
 	 Great Southwest Flute Fair – 2006 Tucson
 	 National Flute Association – Professional Flute Choir – 2007 Albuquerque
 	 Great Southwest Flute Fair - 2007 Tucson
 	 Arizona Flute Society – 2008 Phoenix
Industry Awards
       Rush – Henrietta Alumni Hall of Fame Recording awards
       One World Music - Best Album 2013 for Transformation       One World Music – Best Album Acoustic 2014 for Sanctuary III: Beyond the Dream       Zone Music Reporter – Best Album Acoustic 2014 for Sanctuary III: Beyond the Dream       Echoes - #1 on Echoes Chart and CD of the Month for January 2015 for Sanctuary III: Beyond the Dream       Hollywood Music in Media Awards Nomination - New Age - Sanctuary III: Beyond the Dream       Zone Music Reporter – Best Meditation and Relaxation Album 2015 for Flute Flight       One World Music Radio – Nomination for Best Album Acoustic 2015 for Flute Flight''
       Hollywood Music and Media Nominations – "Song for Rex" (March 2015), "Looking Through" (November 2015), "Dark Horse" (April 2016)
       Zone Music Reporter - Winner Best Instrumental Album Acoustic (2016), 'Trialogue'
       Zone Music Reporter - Nomination for Best Relaxation/Mediation Album (2016), 'Whispers from Silence'
       One World Music Radio - Nominated Best New Age Album (2016), 'Whispers from Silence'
       Round Glass Music Awards - Nomination Best Contemporary Instrumental Album (2016) - 'Majestica - In the Midst of Stars'
       Zone Music Reporter - Winner Best Relaxation/Meditation Album (2017), 'Let There Be Light'
       Zone Music Reporter - Nomination Best Relaxation/Meditation Album (2017), 'Traveler'
       One World Music Radio - Winner Best New Age Album (2017), 'Traveler'
       Zone Music Reporter - Winner Best Chill/Groove Album (2018) 'Majestica-Auriga to Orion'
       Zone Music Reporter - Nominated Best World Album (2019) 'The Space Between Breaths' w/Will Clipman
       Zone Music Reporter - Winner Best Relaxation/Meditation Album (2019) 'Sound Currents' w/Tom Moore
       Zone Music Reporter - Winner Best Ambient Album (2019) 'A Journey for Mankind' w/Tom Moore

Associations
 	National Flute Association
 	Arizona Flute Society – Vice President and Program Chair (2011)
 	NARAS Voting Member
 	The American Society of Composers, Authors, and Publishers (ASCAP)
 	Arizona World Music Initiative (AZWMI)– Founder and President
       World Flute Society
       NARIP
       Mindful Music Association - Founding Board Member and Secretary

References

External links

American women composers
American flautists
Musicians from Syracuse, New York
Musicians from Rochester, New York
Musicians from Phoenix, Arizona
1963 births
Living people
Women flautists
Heart Dance Records artists
20th-century American women musicians
20th-century American composers
20th-century women composers
21st-century American women
20th-century flautists